The 1957 William & Mary Indians football team represented William & Mary during the 1957 NCAA University Division football season. On November 9, 1957, William & Mary traveled to Raleigh, North Carolina to play #10 ranked NC State in Riddick Stadium. The Indians (2–5–0) stunned the Wolfpack (5–0–2) with a 7–6 win. The loss dropped NC State nine spots in the following AP Poll to #19. It marked the first time that William & Mary had ever defeated a national top 10 opponent

Schedule

NFL Draft selections

References

William and Mary
William & Mary Tribe football seasons
William